The River Tees forms the traditional border between Yorkshire and County Durham, passes through the Teesside Urban area built-up area, and has many crossings. The natural low lying landscape of the surrounding landscape together with the development of shipping on the water way has led a number of unusual bridges being built.

History of crossings
An early crossing of the Tees was made by the Romans, with the construction of a bridge at Piercebridge, along with a corresponding fortress. The bridge, built on the route of Dere Street, and as a result it likely saw a great deal of military traffic going between fortress at York to the northern frontier. It was first built in wood around 90 AD, before being rebuilt in stone, possibly when the first bridge washed away. The use of the bridge may of continued into the sub-Roman period.

Crossings of the Tees continued to be important in the journey from north to south, and vice versa, along the east coast, during the medieval period. During the 13th century it was described as "the major obstacle to speedy travel out of the diocese of Durham southwards", with the contemporary fords, bridges and ferries proving particularly inconvenient in the winter period. This included the Great North Road, for which the Croft Bridge was built in the 13th or 14th centuries. Yarm bridge was built around 1400, by bishop Skirlaw.

In 1771 a major flood on the Tees, along with others in the North-East, caused major damage to the river's bridges, completely destroying some. The  Wynch Bridge, Supposedly the oldest suspension bridge in Europe, dating from 1741, was lifted from it's moorings. The bridge in Gilmonby was recorded as being destroyed after having only been fully operational for 3 years. On the other hand, The medieval Yarm bridge was affected by the flood, despite every other building in the town being damaged.

With the industrialisation of the area through the 19th century, many new bridges where needed closer to the ports mouth. When the Stockton and Darlington railway, first opened in 1825, released that the staiths at Stockton where two small to export the needed amount of coal, the decision was made to start export closer to the mouth on the other bank, at Port Darlington (later Middlesbrough). This required the building of the first suspension railway bridge. This would moved the commercial centre of gravity of Teesside further down stream, where many future bridges would be built.

By the end of that century there were 21 principal firms on and adjacent to the Tees in the Stockton and Thornaby area, with 36 firms in the Middlesbrough area. This lead to the development of two of the most famous bridges on the river, The Transporter Bridge, in 1911, and the Newport Bridge, in 1934, both trying to balance the needs of travers across the river and shipping down the river.

List

The following is a list of crossings of the River Tees, heading downstream, from source to it's mouth in the North Sea. This including road, rail, pipe and foot/cycle bridges and fords.

Source to Barnard Castle

Barnard Castle to Piercebridge

Piercebridge to Yarm

Yarm to the river mouth

See also 

 Tees Railway Viaduct (1860-1971).

References

Notes

Citations

External links 
 

Tees